Mount Wanous is a prominent, bare, conical mountain,  high, standing 4.5 nautical miles (8 km) east of Pierce Peak at the northeast edge of Mackin Table in the Patuxent Range, Pensacola Mountains, Antarctica.

It was mapped by the United States Geological Survey (USGS) from surveys and U.S. Navy air photos from 1956 to 1966. It was named by the Advisory Committee on Antarctic Names (US-ACAN) for Richard E. Wanous, a geophysicist in the Pensacola Mountains between 1965 and 1966.

Mountains of Queen Elizabeth Land
Pensacola Mountains